Jan Esper (born 1968) studied geography at the University of Bonn, where he later earned his doctorate. After a postdoc position at Columbia University in New York City, he continued his work on dendrochronology at the Swiss Federal Institute for Forest, Snow and Landscape Research (WSL), and qualified as a professor at the University of Bern. In 2018, Esper became a member of the Academy of Sciences and Literature. Since 2010, he has been a professor at the Department of Geography at Johannes Gutenberg University Mainz.

Esper's research focuses on global climate change, paleoclimate, urban climate and dendrochronology. In 2020, he received the European Research Council (ERC) Advanced Grant to improve climate reconstructions from tree rings. His research has notably included hockey stick graph temperature reconstructions.

Selected bibliography

References

External links
 
 

1968 births
Living people
University of Bonn alumni